is a Japanese manga series written and illustrated by Tsukasa Hojo. The series was adapted into an anime series produced by Sunrise and broadcast by Yomiuri Television.

City Hunter 3 was broadcast for 13 episodes from October 15, 1989 to January 21, 1990. The opening theme for the series was "Running to Horizon" by Tetsuya Komuro and the ending theme was "Atsuku Naretara" by Kiyomi Suzuki.

It was later released on 6 VHS between November 1990 and April 1991. A thirty-two disc DVD box set City Hunter Complete published by Aniplex was released in Japan on August 31, 2005. The set contained all four series, the TV specials and animated movies as well as an art book and figures of Ryo and Kaori. The City Hunter 3 discs from the set were released individually on July 23, 2008.

ADV Films released the series in North America. City Hunter 3 was released as a single box set on December 2, 2003.

Episode list

References

3